Opisthotrematidae is a family of trematodes belonging to the order Plagiorchiida.

Genera:
 Folitrema Blair, 1981
 Lankatrema Crusz & Fernand, 1954
 Lankatrematoides Blair, 1981
 Moniligerum Dailey, Vogelbein & Forrester, 1988
 Opisthotrema Fischer, 1884
 Pulmonicola Poche, 1926

References

Plagiorchiida